The Edict on Maximum Prices (Latin: Edictum	de Pretiis Rerum Venalium, "Edict Concerning the Sale Price of Goods"; also known as the Edict on Prices or the Edict of Diocletian) was issued in 301 AD by Diocletian. The document denounces monopolists and sets maximum prices and wages for all important articles and services. 

The Edict exists only in fragments found mainly in the eastern part of the empire, where Diocletian ruled. The reconstructed fragments have been sufficient to estimate many prices for goods and services for historical economists (although the Edict attempts to set maximum prices, not fixed ones). It was probably issued from Antioch or Alexandria and was set up in inscriptions in Greek and Latin.

The Edict on Maximum Prices is still the longest surviving piece of legislation from the period of the Tetrarchy. The Edict was criticized by Lactantius, a rhetorician from Nicomedia, who blamed the emperors for the inflation and told of fighting and bloodshed that erupted from price tampering. By the end of Diocletian's reign in 305, the Edict was for all practical purposes ignored. The Roman economy as a whole was not substantively stabilized until Constantine's coinage reforms in the 310s.

History 
During the Crisis of the Third Century, Roman coinage had been greatly debased by the numerous emperors and usurpers who minted their own coins, using base metals to reduce the underlying metallic value of coins used to pay soldiers and public officials.

Earlier in his reign, as well as in 301 around the same time as the Edict on Prices, Diocletian issued Currency Decrees, which attempted to reform the system of taxation and to stabilize the coinage.

It is difficult to know exactly how the coinage was changed, as the values and even the names of coins are often unknown or have been lost in the historical record. [*Following a time of constant wars for power the reign authorities looking for campaign resources made a serie of changes, Diocletian set the value a coin for saving expenses altering the amount of silver cointained in them from 50% and a weight of 5 grams per coin to 1% silver a 3 grams weight producing a huge raise in prices.*] Although the decree was nominally successful for a short time after it was imposed, market forces led to more and more of the decree being disregarded and reinterpreted over time.

In the edict of Diocletian, it was mentioned that the wine from Picenum was the most expensive wine, together with Falerno. Vinum Hadrianum was produced in Picenum, in the city of Hatria or Hadria, the old city of Atri.

Rediscovery 

No complete copy of the decree has been found. The text has been reconstructed from fragments of Greek and Latin copies at a number of different sites, most of them in the eastern provinces of Roman empire: Phrygia and Caria in Asia Minor, mainland Greece, Crete, and Cyrenaica. The version of the decree inscribed on the wall of the bouleuterion at Stratonikeia in Caria was the first to be discovered and copied, by William Sherard, the English consul at Smyrna, in 1709. The first attempt at a composite text was made in 1826 by William Martin Leake, working from Sherard's copy of the Stratonikeia inscription and a fragment purchased in Alexandria and subsequently brought to Aix-en-Provence. A comprehensive edition of all fragments known by the end of the 19th century was edited by Theodor Mommsen with commentary by Hugo Blümner; this edition formed the basis for a new text and English translation published in 1940 by Elsa Graser, who also incorporated fragments found after the publication of Mommsen's edition. Two further critical editions were published in the early 1970s, and new fragments have continued to be discovered.

Contents 
Although incomplete, enough of the text is preserved to make the general structure and contents of the edict clear.

All coins in the Decrees and the Edict were valued according to the denarius, which Diocletian hoped to replace with a new system based on the silver argenteus and its fractions (although some modern writers call this the "denarius communis", this phrase is a modern invention, and is not found in any ancient text). The argenteus seems to have been set at 100 denarii, the silver-washed nummus at 25 denarii, and the bronze radiate at 4 or 5 denarii. The copper laureate was raised from 1 denarius to 2 denarii. The gold aureus was revalued at at least 1,200 denarii (although one document calls it a "solidus" it was still heavier  than the solidus introduced by Constantine a few years later).

During the previous decades the decreasing amount of silver in the billon coins had fuelled inflation. This inflation is understood to be the reason the decree was issued. Issues of economic system feedback were not well understood at the time.

The first two-thirds of the Edict doubled the value of the copper and billon coins, and set the death penalty for profiteers and speculators, who were blamed for the inflation and who were compared to the barbarian tribes attacking the empire. Merchants were forbidden to take their goods elsewhere and charge a higher price, and transport costs could not be used as an excuse to raise prices.

The last third of the Edict, divided into 32 sections, imposed a price ceiling – a list of maxima – for well over a thousand products. These products included various food items (beef, grain, wine, beer, sausages, etc.), clothing (shoes, cloaks, etc.), freight charges for sea travel, and weekly wages. The highest limit was on one pound of purple-dyed silk, which was set at 150,000 denarii (the price of a lion was set at the same price).

Coinage 
Each cell represents the ratio of the coin in the column to the coin in the row: thus 1000 denarii were worth 1 solidus.

References

Further reading

External links

 

 Prices given in the price edict as compared with modern prices, at Civilization.org.uk

301
4th century in law
Crisis of the Third Century
Price controls
Economy of ancient Rome
History of competition law
4th century in Italy
Maximum Prices
300s in the Roman Empire
4th-century inscriptions
Diocletian
Regulation